Kraven the Hunter (Sergei Kravinoff; Russian: Сергей Кравинов) is a fictional character appearing in American comic books published by Marvel Comics. Debuting in The Amazing Spider-Man issue #15 (August 1964) as an adversary to the superhero Spider-Man, he has since endured as one of the web-slinger's most formidable foes, and is part of the collective of adversaries that make up Spider-Man's rogues' gallery. Kraven has also come into conflict with other heroes, such as Black Panther and Tigra. He is the half-brother of the Chameleon and one of the founding members of the Sinister Six.

In Kraven's first appearance, he refers to Spider-Man as "the most dangerous game" which is a direct reference to the 1924 short story of the same name The Most Dangerous Game, in which General Zaroff, a Russian big game hunter, hunts people as sport.

Kraven is typically portrayed as a renowned big-game hunter whose goal in life is to beat Spider-Man to prove himself as the world's greatest hunter. Though he is often overconfident in his own abilities, which he likes to boast about, he possesses a great sense of honor, and treats his adversaries as equals until proven otherwise. Because of this, Kraven has sometimes been depicted as an antihero and has teamed up with other heroes, including Spider-Man and Squirrel Girl, in The Unbeatable Squirrel Girl (2015–2019).

The character is widely regarded as one of Spider-Man's most formidable enemies, and has gained considerable attention from storylines such as 1987's "Fearful Symmetry: Kraven's Last Hunt," 2010's "Grim Hunt", 2015–2019's "The Unbeatable Squirrel Girl’s Friend Kraven", and 2019's "Hunted". In 2009, Kraven was ranked as IGN's 53rd greatest comic book villain of all time. The character has appeared in numerous Spider-Man media adaptations over the years including animated series and video games. Aaron Taylor-Johnson will portray Kraven in the Sony's Spider-Man Universe film Kraven the Hunter (2023).

Publication history
The character first appeared in The Amazing Spider-Man issue #15 (August 1964), and was created by writer Stan Lee and artist Steve Ditko. Though he would occasionally appear in other characters' titles, he was most frequently used as a Spider-Man foe. He is killed off in the acclaimed 1987 storyline by J. M. DeMatteis, Mike Zeck, and Bob McLeod, "Kraven's Last Hunt". Although generally considered to be the definitive Kraven the Hunter story, the story originally had a completely different character in Kraven's role. Writer DeMatteis recounted:

Despite Kraven the Hunter being one of Spider-Man's most long-standing archenemies, DeMatteis claims that none of Marvel's editorial staff objected to the proposal to have him killed in the story. Kraven later returns as a ghost in the graphic novel The Amazing Spider-Man: Soul of the Hunter, also by DeMatteis, Zeck, and McLeod. DeMatteis also wrote "Kraven's First Hunt" for The Sensational Spider-Man Annual '96, a retelling of The Amazing Spider-Man #15 which incorporated several DeMatteis retcons, such as that Kraven was abusive towards the Chameleon.

Fictional character biography
Sergei Kravinoff (Сергей Кравинов) is a Russian immigrant, the son of an aristocrat who fled to the United States with his family in 1917 after the Russian nobility was decimated by the February Revolution and subsequent collapse of the reign of Tsar Nicholas II.

Kraven is a maniacal big game hunter who seeks to defeat Spider-Man to prove that he is the greatest hunter in the world. Unlike other hunters, he typically disdains the use of guns or bow and arrows, preferring to take down large dangerous animals with his bare hands. He also lives by a code of honour of sorts, choosing to hunt his game fairly. He consumes a mystical serum to give himself enhanced strength and dramatically slow the aging process. Kraven was trained as a hunter largely by a mysterious man named Gregor, a mercenary who once battled Ka-Zar. Kraven was, at one point, the lover of the voodoo priestess Calypso.

He is contacted by his half-brother the Chameleon to defeat Spider-Man. He leads Spider-Man to Central Park with the help of the Chameleon, who disguises himself as Kraven to use himself as a decoy while the real Kraven ambushes the hero. However, despite Kraven having weakened Spider-Man with a poisonous dart, Spider-Man prevails in the end. Spider-Man proves a frustrating quarry because Kraven continually underestimates the superhero's resourcefulness.

Kraven becomes a founding member of the Sinister Six when he accepts Doctor Octopus's offer to form a team to fight Spider-Man where they capture Aunt May and Betty Brant. He attacks Spider-Man in Central Park with three tigers. Spider-Man easily fights off the attackers and secures the next clue to where Aunt May and Betty Brant are being held. After Aunt May and Betty Brant are rescued, Kraven the Hunter and the rest of the Sinister Six are arrested by the police.

While in the Savage Land, Kraven the Hunter found Gog in a spaceship that he stumbles upon. Realizing how useful Gog can be, Kraven the Hunter decides to use him in a plot to conquer the Savage Land. After kidnapping the visiting Gwen Stacy from a camp in the Savage Land, Kraven and Gog battle the heroes Ka-Zar and Spider-Man. While Ka-Zar deals with Kraven, Spider-Man defeats Gog by luring him into a patch of quicksand, which he sinks to the bottom of.

Fearful Symmetry: Kraven's Last Hunt

Determined to end his life as he becomes older, frustrated with his failing health and continuing failure to defeat Spider-Man, Kraven sets out a final hunt for Spider-Man. After capturing Spider-Man, he shoots him with a coma-inducing drug and buries him alive on his estate. To complete his victory, he attempts to become Spider-Man's clear superior by impersonating him in a brutal vigilante campaign and capturing Vermin, the one foe Spider-Man had never been able to defeat on his own (Spider-Man's last battle with Vermin required Captain America's assistance).

After Spider-Man emerges from his grave two weeks later, Kraven explains his actions to him and sets Vermin free, reaffirming to Kraven that his foe is an honorable man. Spider-Man goes after Vermin to prevent his killing again, giving Kraven the opportunity to leave a final confession of his crimes against Spider-Man and then commit suicide. Because of his suicide, his soul is unable to find rest until Spider-Man confronts his risen corpse on Kraven's behalf.

The Gauntlet and Grim Hunt

Across "The Gauntlet" and "Grim Hunt", Kraven is resurrected from the dead by Sasha Kravinoff and the Kravinoff family with a ritual using the blood of Spider-Man. He is shown to now be explosively psychopathic and cold towards his family, beating his son Vladimir and daughter Ana and expressing little attention towards his wife. After being stabbed by his daughter Ana, Sergei recovers, stating that Sasha restored him with corrupted blood which he calls "unlife". They pull off the mask of the corpse of Spider-Man hung in their mantel and discover that Kaine is in Spider-Man's costume. Spider-Man, in his black costume, confronts Kraven and the rest of the Kravinoff Family. Spider-Man is tempted to kill Kraven, but he refuses to do so when he is reminded by Julia Carpenter (who has inherited the powers of Madame Web after her death) that committing murder is not in his moral code. Following their defeat by Spider-Man, Kraven and his family escape to the Savage Land. While there, Kraven brutally kills Sasha (who complained that Kraven would have to hunt them to prove their place in the Kravinoff family) and euthanizes Vladimir. Alyosha flees in disgust of what his dad did to his stepmom and half-brother afterwards. Kraven and Ana discuss rebuilding the Kravinoff family, which leads to Ana running off to hunt Alyosha to prove herself worthy to Kraven and rebuild the Kravinoff family.

It was later revealed that back in the 1950s, Kraven the Hunter was a member of Nick Fury's version of the Avengers alongside Dominic Fortune I, Dum Dum Dugan, Namora, Silver Sable, Sabretooth, and Ulysses Bloodstone, tracking a stolen version of the Super-Soldier Serum combined with the Infinity Formula that had been stolen by a group of Nazis attempting to create their own Captain America.

While he is in the Savage Land, Agent Venom lands in the area on an unrelated mission from the federal government. Mistaking him to be Spider-Man, Kraven attacks him and gains the upper hand before Venom escapes.

At one point, Kraven is contacted by a doctor who once treated him when a past hunt went wrong, the doctor requesting that Kraven track down a recent patient of hers - who had been used as a test subject to duplicate another man's electrical abilities — as well as asking that he capture the Black Panther — currently acting as a 'local' vigilante to regain his sense of self after the destruction of Wakanda's vibranium - in return for her help finding a way for him to die. With the aid of Storm, T'Challa is able to stay ahead of Kraven long enough to convince him that the doctor had lied about being able to kill him, Kraven agreeing to leave T'Challa alone and take the doctor's mutated animal subjects back with him into the wild.

When their identities became fractured after a temporary separation, the Hulk discovers that Bruce Banner had hired Kraven to find the lost city of the Sasquatches. Although the Hulk was uninterested with helping the Sasquatches deal with Kraven, he changes his mind and beats up Kraven.

Kaine, in the alias of the Scarlet Spider, later encountered Kraven the Hunter, who was dressed as the Scarlet Spider to torment him. With the help of Ana, Kraven kidnapped Kaine's friends to motivate the Scarlet Spider to fight him. In the end, Kaine delivered Kraven a fatal blow in the chest, which paralyzed his heart. But using the same attack, Kaine brought him back to life supposedly still breaking the curse. Following the fight, both Kravens disappeared.

The Unbeatable Squirrel Girl

Kraven, still claiming to be cursed, next battles Squirrel Girl at Empire State University, having earned her ire by lashing out at the local squirrels, including Tippy-Toe. Kraven departs when Squirrel Girl informs him of the existence of sea monsters like Giganto and challenges him to hunt them, instead of limiting himself to going after the same prey he did prior to his resurrection. He later returns to abduct Howard the Duck, but gets trapped with Howard and Squirrel Girl in a manhunt as the hunted. After surviving, he vows to only "hunt the hunters".

During the "Avengers: Standoff!" storyline, Kraven the Hunter was an inmate of Pleasant Hill, a gated community established by S.H.I.E.L.D. who used Kobik's abilities to turn Kraven the Hunter into a zookeeper. He rallied some of his fellow inmates to help him find Kobik and bring her to Baron Helmut Zemo.

During the "Opening Salvo" part of the "Secret Empire" storyline, Kraven the Hunter is recruited by Baron Helmut Zemo to join the Army of Evil. At the time when Manhattan was surrounded by a Darkforce Dome, Kraven the Hunter raided the Daily Bugle to find information to the identity of Spider-Man. Knowing that J. Jonah Jameson would be in danger, Phil Sheldon's daughter Jennie headed to J. Jonah Jameson's house to warn him. After Kraven the Hunter attacked J. Jonah Jameson, Jennie Sheldon fired a signal flare into the sky. This attracted the attention of Spider-Woman, who defeated Kraven the Hunter. Jennie Sheldon even took pictures of the fight.

At the time when Venom encountered some Dinosaur People in the sewers, Kraven the Hunter followed Venom and killed an Ankylosaurus-type Dinosaur Person before engaging Venom in battle. He was fended off by Venom, who vowed to fight Kraven again. Upon the news of Dinosaur People being found beneath the streets of New York City, Mayor Wilson Fisk and NYPD Commissioner Chris Rafferty appointed Kraven the Hunter to lead a SWAT Team into the sewers and eliminate them. When Venom deactivated each trap and confronted Kraven, Venom was caught off-guard when Kraven the Hunter revealed his secret ally Shriek, who used her attacks on Venom and then collapsed the ceiling over him. Shriek then tells Kraven the Hunter that she can have Eddie Brock's head after the mission is done. As the Dinosaur People feed on the rats that enter their lair, Kraven the Hunter sneaks up on some Dinosaur People and kills them. Venom catches up to Kraven the Hunter and fights him and Shriek. With help from Tana, Venom stated that the Dinosaur People were not killing anybody and that they are only surviving underground. Kraven the Hunter and Shriek are arrested by the NYPD, as the captain stated that he never liked Kraven the Hunter anyway.

Kraven the Hunter was hired by the evil organization Rampart to lure Captain America to them. After a brief struggle with Kraven the Hunter, Captain America was frozen in ice by Rampart's freeze cannon.

Squirrel Girl has helped Kraven reform, teaming up with him to fight other villains, even establishing a friendship with him. She helps Kraven realize that Spider-Man is not even close to being the most dangerous prey in the Marvel Universe.

Hunted

In a prelude to "Hunted", Kraven the Hunter reminisces about how Sasha, Vladimir, and Alyosha were killed by him and Ana for not living up to his legacy. After cutting a deal with the High Evolutionary, Kraven the Hunter has 87 clones of him created, trained as the Sons of Kraven, and sent out to prove themselves by being hunted by each other. This motif caused Ana to leave him. The one that hunted and killed the other Sons of Kraven was labeled as the Last Son of Kraven. With help from the Taskmaster, the Black Ant, and Arcade, Kraven the Hunter starts hunting various animal-themed characters, like the Beetle, the Kangaroo, the Owl, the Puma, the Serpent Society, the Squid, and the White Rabbit. In the case of the King Cobra, the Rhino, the Scorpion, Stegron the Dinosaur Man, the Tarantula, and the Vulture, they were grouped together as the Savage Six. While making the final preparations for the "Great Hunt," Kraven the Hunter recaps on his own immortality when it was revealed that the Kraven the Hunter that was stabbed by the Scarlet Spider was actually a clone. Kraven the Hunter sends the Last Son of Kraven to capture Spider-Man for the Great Hunt. After a Hunter-Bot created by Arcade Industries is demonstrated on the Iguana, Kraven the Hunter and Arcade begin the Great Hunt, where Central Park is surrounded by a dome that is from the same technology as the Planetary Defense System. It is revealed that the moment the individual connects to the Hunter-Bot and if it is destroyed, then the individual is killed, which is what happens when the Vulture destroys Bob's Hunter-Bot. Kraven the Hunter plans this from the beginning to punish the hunters for killing animals for sport. Kraven the Hunter has Arcade tell the Vulture that there is a chance to break the force field by killing more Hunter-Bots. During a fight between the Hunter-Bots and the animal-themed characters, Kraven the Hunter's secret motive is to force Spider-Man into killing him again so that he can be free from his dreadful curse. He does this by trapping Curt Connors when he tries to rescue his son, Billy. Spider-Man was forced to "kill" Curt by tearing out the implant chip that prevented Curt hurting humans as the Lizard, despite the risk that taking out the chip would kill Curt. After Spider-Man found the dead bodies of the guards that were killed when the Lizard escaped, he was confronted by Kraven the Hunter. During their fight, Spider-Man figured out that Kraven the Hunter was the one who killed the guards to frame the Lizard, as the wounds are too precise for the Lizard's feral claws. To guilt Spider-Man into becoming a hunter, Kraven the Hunter attempts to force Spider-Man to watch the Lizard save Billy and the Black Cat from the Last Son of Kraven, but Spider-Man rejects the idea that this can only be accomplished through violence. Upon realizing that he was the beast that he was wanting to kill all along, Kraven the Hunter released all the surviving animal-themed characters and sends Spider-Man to protect Mary Jane. Kraven the Hunter then dons a copy of Spider-Man's black costume to act like him once more. When the Last Son of Kraven was conned into strangling Kraven the Hunter to death, he soon realized that he was fooled when he sees Spider-Man swinging away. His funeral is later attended by the Last Son of Kraven. The Chameleon is revealed to be one of the attendees as he is pleased that Kraven the Hunter spared him from the Great Hunt. As he walks away, the Chameleon quotes to his dead half-brother to sleep well and states "You needn't worry. The world is no longer your burden. Besides, there won't be much of it left soon...not by the time I've finished".

The Unbeatable Squirrel Girl II

Sometime later, Kraven is pulled through time from moments before his death by Galactus to help their shared friend Squirrel Girl defeat Melissa Morbeck and her own coterie of time-displaced supervillains and former villains. Telling her not to blame herself for his ultimate fate. After reuniting with Doreen and thanking her for all she had done for him Kraven, bids Doreen a final goodbye before being returned to his death.

Kraven: Excuse the interruption, but I believe we are being sent back too, Doreen.Squirrel Girl: Kraven, I--Kraven: Nyet. You are alive, and we did good when we had the chance. That is all anyone can ask from life. I do not know what happens now, and my memories of this will be erased. But there is something that I would like you to recall whenever you think of me, my dear friend. It is a saying from Russia... "Govoryat, shto kur doyat." Belka... Wink! ...don't believe everything you hear.

Powers and abilities
By regularly ingesting the potion made from various unnamed jungle herbs, Kraven grants himself superhuman physical abilities, making him a physical threat to Spider-Man, although these powers are not as developed as those possessed by Spider-Man. Kraven's body is also more durable and more resistant to certain forms of injury than the body of a normal human. He can withstand great impact forces, such as falling from several stories or being repeatedly struck by a superhumanly strong opponent, that would severely injure or kill a normal human, with little to no injury to himself. The effects of the potion have dramatically altered Kraven's aging process to the point that he has aged little, if at all, over several decades. Despite being over 70 years of age, he has the physical appearance of a 30-year-old man.

The potion enhances Kraven's sight, hearing, and smell to superhuman levels, adding to his already impressive tracking skills. He can see farther, and with much greater clarity, than a normal human. His hearing is similarly enhanced, enabling him to detect sounds which an ordinary human cannot, or sounds that a normal human could detect, but at much greater distances. Kraven can use his sense of smell to track a target by scent, much as some animals do, even if the scent has been somewhat eroded by natural factors.

Even without his superhuman powers, Kraven is an Olympic-level athlete, and a gifted tactician, hunter and hand-to-hand combatant. He also has great knowledge of pressure points, both in the anatomy of humans and in many animals. He can strike at these nerve clusters with pinpoint accuracy, allowing him to incapacitate more powerful opponents or animals. He is familiar with many exotic poisons and tranquilizers, which he often uses during his hunts.

Due to a flaw in the ceremony that resurrected him, Kraven was given "the unlife... the eternal curse", as he discovered when his daughter stabbed him through the heart. According to Kraven, he can now only die by Spider-Man's hand. However, this curse was apparently broken when Kaine temporarily killed Kraven by stopping his heart and then restarting it with the same move.

Family
Kraven the Hunter had different family members and clones. He even fathered several children who have followed in his footsteps:

Chameleon

Grim Hunter
Vladimir Kravinoff was a son of Sergei Kravinoff, the infamous adversary of Spider-Man known as Kraven the Hunter. Unlike his illegitimate half-brother Alyosha Kravinoff who was raised in shame in Africa, Vladimir grew up in Russia benefiting from his father's wealth and luxuries. However, their father often neglected both sons while he pursued his various international quarries. Unaware of his siblings, Vladimir was raised by Sergei's servant Gregor who acted as a surrogate father teaching him Sergei's hunting techniques. When Vlad was still a boy, Sergei put his son through a rite of passage, hunting Vladimir while disguised as the fabled "Grim Hunter." Impressed by his son's abilities learned under Gregor, Sergei began to train Vlad personally. Vladimir Kravinoff took up the name "Grim Hunter" and decided to hunt down Spider-Man and several of his foes. He only had one battle with Spider-Man, and his methods were nearly the same as his father's. He was briefly involved with the Hobgoblin, even giving his identity of Jason Macendale his father's super-strength formula which reacted to the anomalies in his bloodstream which gave him greater power. This is perhaps the reason why Vladimir became more powerful than his father when he took the treatment. When he got out of jail, he decided to track Spider-Man down again only to fight the Scarlet Spider instead. Kaine (a clone of Spider-Man) arrived and after a confrontation, Vladimir was killed by the insane duplicate. On death's door, he staggered to Gregor falling in his arms and died shortly after that.

During "The Gauntlet and Grim Hunt" storyline, Sasha Kravinoff sacrifices Mattie Franklin as part of a revival ritual that resurrects Vladimir as a humanoid lion creature. Vladimir being revived as a humanoid lion was the result of Mattie not being a "pure spider." Vladimir later assists Ana Kravinoff and Alyosha Kravinoff with capturing Anya Corazon as well as a second attempt to capture Arachne. Following Kraven the Hunter's resurrection, Vladimir was shown attempting to attack Arachne and Araña while they are bound. Sergei fends off Vladimir rather brutally. Sasha mentioned to Sergei that Vladimir's sub-human state was the result of a test resurrection to see if she can revive Sergei. After Spider-Man defeated the Kravinoff family, they escaped to the Savage Land where Sergei killed Sasha (because she complained about being hunted to become a true Kravinoff) and euthanizes Vladimir (which Kraven does due "to respect for the dead").

Alyosha Kravinoff
Alyosha Kravinoff is a mutant who is the second Kraven the Hunter some time after the death of Vladmir.

Unlike Vladimir, Alyosha was separated from his family and raised in an African jungle. After Kraven the Hunter's suicide, Alyosha came to New York City to investigate the father he barely knew. Dressed as Kraven, Alyosha confronted his uncle Dmitri Smerdyakov (AKA Chameleon). Believing his abusive half-brother had returned from the dead, Chameleon revealed to Alyosha much about the dysfunctional Kravinoff family. Kraven's former lover Calypso Ezili did actually return from the dead and she mistook Alyosha for Kraven the Hunter. She seduced Alyosha, but afterwards he spurned her affections. Later, riding a bull elephant atop Manhattan's rooftops, Alyosha attacked Spider-Man. He poisoned him with a hallucinogenic dart, but then set him free. While at the Kravinoff estate, Alyosha was learning about his father from Spider-Man when Calypso returned with Kraven's tribesmen. She set the home ablaze and killed all but Gulyadkin the Lion. Calypso poisoned Alyosha and Spider-Man and used her hypnotic powers to force the two to fight to the death. Spider-Man resisted and injured Calypso, while Alyosha subdued her with his lion. Despite asking for her forgiveness, Alyosha savagely killed Calypso and all the tribesmen with her.

He was later hired by the city of New York to help capture the Fantastic Four's enigmatic enormous canid Puppy. Next, he was hired by White Wolf, head of the deposed Wakandan secret police, to capture Black Panther. Black Panther turned the battle around, nearly killing Alyosha. Sandman later invited Alyosha to join Sandman's Sinister Six to hunt Doctor Octopus and Senator Ward (the host body for the alien Z'nox). Venom, slighted at his rejection by the Six, hunted each of the team members. Refusing to be "the hunted," Alyosha trapped Venom with fire, but Venom seriously injured him and escaped.

Alyosha then adopted a more relaxed personality as a suave, witty ladies' man. As "Al," he began dating Timber Hughes, an aspiring actress who worked as a waitress at an all-villain bar. Al sought to help Timber's career in Hollywood by becoming a director. Despite celebrity connections, Al's efforts were stonewalled by arrogance, greed, and corruption within the Hollywood elite. Forced out of Hollywood by the powerful Rothstein brothers, Al is beaten while Timber was brutally raped. Both Al and Timber exacted vengeance which involved defeating another half-brother Ned Tannengarden (who was later killed by Chameleon) and left Hollywood to pursue heroics in New York City.

Alyosha is one of few mutants that retained their superhuman powers after the M-Day. He is one of the superpowered beings recruited within the Beyond! miniseries by Stranger posing as the Beyonder.

Alyosha Kraven later eventually becomes fully deranged from experimenting with his father's potions, and in his madness began collecting a zoo of animal-themed superhumans, including Bushmaster II, Gargoyle II, Tiger Shark, Kangaroo II, Aragorn (the version that was owned by the Vatican Black Knight), Vulture, Mongoose, Man-Bull, Dragon Man, Swarm, Mandrill, Grizzly III, Frog-Man, and Rhino. In the end, the Punisher (whom Kraven referred to as "Tiny Monkey") managed to sabotage this zoo. Kraven himself escapes to the Savage Land.

During "The Gauntlet" storyline, Alyosha returned to New York to help his half-sister Ana and stepmother Sasha in the Grim Hunt by hunting Kaine. They then witness Spider-Man's fight with the Lizard. He was present at the ritual where Sasha sacrificed Mattie Franklin as part of a revival ritual that resurrects his half-brother Vladimir as a humanoid lion-like creature. After the Kravinoff Family was defeated, Alyosha alongside the other Kravinoff Family members escaped to the Savage Land. Alyosha soon abandoned his family after Kraven killed Sasha and Vladimir. In an attempt to impress Kraven, Ana pursued Alyosha with the intent of killing him in exchange that he trains her to rebuild the Kravinoff Family.

Alyosha was later confirmed to have been killed in the Savage Land by his sister Ana when she and their father returned from the Savage Land to hunt down Kaine in Houston, Texas.

Nedrocci Tannengarden
There was a third son named Nedrocci "Ned" Tannengarden who tried to kill Alyosha, but he was murdered by the Chameleon (who, during that time, believed himself to be the original Kraven the Hunter).

Xraven
It was revealed during 2009's X-Men/Spider-Man crossover miniseries that years earlier, Kraven made a deal with Mister Sinister. He and the Blob tracked down the X-Men, and they fought the united forces of Spider-Man and the original X-Men. Kraven fled after a short battle, but not before wounding each member of the X-Men. Kraven returned to Sinister, with genetic samples from Cyclops, Marvel Girl, Iceman, Angel, and Beast. Furthermore, Sinister requested from Kraven a sample of his DNA. Mister Sinister later cut a deal with Carnage to obtain a sample of the Carnage symbiote. After removing the sentience from the Carnage symbiote sample, Mister Sinister combined it with the DNA of the original X-Men and Kraven the Hunter, where he would use this creation at a later date. Years later after the death of Kraven, an ex-Morlock who had kept his powers post M-Day named Joe Buggs was murdered by a mysterious mutant hunter. His friend Ed (who had lost his powers) went to the X-Men for help. He claimed that the man who killed Buggs was Kraven the Hunter. Although they were skeptical about Kraven's apparent resurrection, the X-Men called on the help of Spider-Man, who had battled Kraven many times over the years. After discussing the battle that they had with Kraven years ago and the fact that he had given samples of the X-Men's DNA to Sinister for cloning, the lights went out on the wing where they were located. The hunter attacked and quickly dispatched Colossus, but was held at bay by Spider-Man's webbing. He broke free, claiming his name is Xraven. The X-Men quickly realize that Xraven has all of the powers of the original X-Men, while also sporting retractable claws, big hands and feet, fangs, and wings that have a very flexible skeletal structure enough for him to press them to the back of his torso and legs with only the slightest bulge visible under his clothing (Carnage's DNA allowed the wings to be flexible). He was able to defeat Cyclops and Shadowcat, holding her hostage, giving the ultimatum that he would kill her if they did not surrender. Spider-Man insulted Xraven, claiming that Kraven would never threaten a helpless girl. Xraven was momentarily fazed by his comment, but attacked again, claiming that he is the "favored one". Cyclops realizes Xraven's weakness and tells him that Mister Sinister sees him as nothing but a pawn. He tells Xraven to read his mind, in order for him to see the kind of a man Sinister really is. After Xraven sees Cyclops's memories, he flees, but the X-Men become aware of the fact that he was able to get DNA samples from Shadowcat, Colossus, Nightcrawler, and Wolverine. Returning to Mister Sinister with the samples, Mister Sinister tells him that he planned to clone a new generation of mutants, and that he would unite all mutantkind. After seeing what Sinister's real intentions were in Cyclops's memories, Xraven destroys the samples, claiming that Mister Sinister would breed slaves as opposed to warriors, and Xraven attacks him. Although it is clear that Mister Sinister survived his confrontation with Xraven, it is currently unknown whether Xraven survived.

Upon researching Xraven, Captain America does not consider him evil. He states that Xraven must be brought in, partly because of the murder he committed and partly to prevent the Kravinoff family from obtaining him.

Ana Kravinoff
The daughter of Kraven the Hunter, Ana Kravinoff becomes the first female to take on the name of Kraven the Hunter. She first appears tracking Spider-Man to his apartment, but mistakenly believes Peter Parker's roommate Vin Gonzales was him. She then methodically ruins Vin's life, and captures him. Despite Vin's claims that he was not Spider-Man, Kraven prepared to hunt him, but was stopped by the real Spider-Man, who was wearing Daredevil's costume (which had eyelids for him to be able to see). At the end, it is revealed that she is Kraven's daughter by a woman called Sasha Aleksandra Nikolaevich (also the mother of the deceased Vladimir Kravinoff). She and her mother have recently set about forming an alliance of Spider-Man villains to get revenge on the wall-crawler and kidnap Madame Web. They also hired Deadpool to keep him distracted while they kidnapped Mattie Franklin. Ana and Sasha later meet up with Alyosha Kravinoff, who assists them in preparing for the "Grim Hunt", where they start going after Kaine.

Ana assists her half-brother Alyosha Kravinoff into attempting to abduct Arachne, only to run afoul of Spider-Man, who repels them. Ana alongside Alyosha, Electro, and Diablo are present when Sasha sacrifices Mattie Franklin as part of a ritual that resurrects Vladimir Kravinoff as a humanoid lion creature. Ana alongside Vladimir and Alyosha attacks Anya Corazon, only to end up fighting Spider-Man, Arachne, Kaine, and Ezekiel (who was really Ana's half-uncle Chameleon in disguise). The Kravinoffs manage to overpower them and make off with Anya and Arachne. After Chameleon sheds his disguise and Spider-Man partially succumbs to the drugs the Kravinoffs have given him, Ana is present when Kaine (dressed as Spider-Man) is killed as a sacrifice as part of a ritual that revives her father Sergei Kravinoff. Following the resurrection, Sergei gets acquainted with his family. When Kraven returns after preventing Vladimir from attacking the captives, he is shown to lack a sense of control, attacking Ana until he is stabbed in the heart by Ana in self-defense. Sergei recovers, stating that Sasha restored him with corrupted blood or the "unlife" as he puts it. When the Kravinoff Family is defeated, Ana alongside the other Kravinoffs escapes to the Savage Land. After Sasha and Vladimir are killed by Kraven and Alyosha flees, she runs off to hunt Alyosha to prove herself to Kraven. She tells Kraven that if she can take down Alyosha, Kraven should train her and help rebuild the Kravinoff family. Otherwise, he will forget about family.

Ana later attacks Anya Corazon (who is now operating as Spider-Girl) in an attempt to finish the hunt she started during The Grim Hunt. Although obviously the stronger fighter, Ana is eventually defeated thanks to Spider-Girl's experience at fighting in New York City. She is thereafter incarcerated.

Ana later escapes incarceration and heads to Houston to hunt Kaine (the current Scarlet Spider). Ana and her brother Alyosha deliver the killing blows to Kaine that lead to his blood resurrecting her father Kraven the Hunter. However, since Kaine himself was resurrected shortly afterwards so that there could be balance between Hunters and Spiders, it remains to be seen what other motives Ana has for Kaine as there are visions of a dark future ahead for the Scarlet Spider.

With the help of Ana, Kraven kidnaps Kaine's friends to motivate the Scarlet Spider to fight him. In the end, Kaine delivers a fatal blow to Kraven, which paralyzes his heart. But using the same attack, Kaine brings him back to life, supposedly breaking the curse. Following the fight, both Kravens disappear.

Ana Kravinoff later serves as the guide to the Inhumans Gorgon and Flint, taking them to the Chimanimani Mountains of Mozambique, Africa, where they found the hidden Inhuman city of Utolan. During this time, Ana reveals that she has Inhuman ancestry on her mother's side, something she discovered while hunting down her mother's family members (and for which her father tried to kill her when she told him). She came to Utolan looking for a cure, but was sedated by order of the councilwoman Sanara, who took some of her genetic material for use in the city's Eugenics-based practices. Ana managed to escape and hunted down Sanara. She was exposed to the Terrigen Mist cloud during her hunt, which awakened her Inhuman genes. As she prepares to kill Sanara, Ana notes that it is time to "embrace [her] nature".

In a prelude to the "Hunted" storyline, Ana accompanies her father in hunting the New Men to draw out the High Evolutionary. When Ana learned that her father had the High Evolutionary make 87 clones of himself, Ana considers this a disgrace to the Kravinoff family and declares herself a "Kravinoff no more" which Kraven shrugs off.

During the "Sinister War" storyline, Ana Kravinoff is discussed as a new recruit for the Sinister Syndicate. Kindred's giant centipedes bring the Sinister Syndicate and Ana to Kindred where Foreigner's group and the Superior Foes are, as Kindred holds a contest for someone to take down Spider-Man so that he can be punished for his sins. Ana is with the Sinister Syndicate when they intercept Overdrive, who was carrying Spider-Man away from Foreigner's group.

Sasha Kravinoff
Kraven's wife and Ana's mother Sasha Kravinoff was part of a Gauntlet on Spider-Man's life, causing chaos and weakening the web-slinger prior to the events that led to resurrecting Kraven from the grave.

Last Son of Kraven
The Last Son of Kraven was one of the many "Sons of Kraven" that was cloned from Kraven the Hunter's DNA by the High Evolutionary. He hunted his fellow clones and returned to Kraven the Hunter, where he proved himself by presenting him with the skulls of his fellow clones. Kraven the Hunter sent the Last Son of Kraven to subdue and capture Spider-Man for the upcoming Great Hunt that is sponsored by Arcade's company, Arcade Industries. The Last Son of Kraven later chased after the Black Cat. Kraven the Hunter donned the black Spider-Man suit, where he tricked the Last Son of Kraven into killing him. After attending his funeral of his "father," the Last Son of Kraven went to the Kravinoff estate, ripped off his clothes, and trashed it out of frustration. After calming down and drinking some wine, the Last Son of Kraven found a letter written to him by his "father" behind Kraven the Hunter's rifle on the wall. The letter from Kraven the Hunter stated that the Last Son of Kraven was to finally inherit his legacy not as Kraven's son, but as the man himself, since he was cloned from his DNA. The Last Son of Kraven read in the letter "You were forged in fire, born in blood. My spirit made flesh. More than my child—you are me, and I am you. One and the same now." This led to the Last Son of Kraven taking on the aliases of both Sergei Kravinoff and Kraven the Hunter, where he cuts his hair, wipes off his tiger stripes, and dons a copy of Kraven the Hunter's costume.

Doctor Octopus and Electro find Kraven the Hunter in the Savage Land hunting a dinosaur. Electro shocks the dinosaur and Doctor Octopus recruits Kraven the Hunter into the Sinister Six by promising him to hunt down the Lizard. Kraven the Hunter joins the Sinister Six into fighting the Savage Six at the time when the Savage Six were attacking the debut of the movie that Mysterio was involved in.

In his first hunt, Kraven the Hunter hunted Deadpool where he started by killing some monsters. Deadpool was able to defeat Kraven the Hunter by having a Soul-Eater transport him to Alaska.

During the "Sinister War" storyline, Kraven the Hunter accompanies the Sinister Six in fighting the Savage Six.

During the "Devil's Reign" storyline, Kraven the Hunter appears as a member of Mayor Wilson Fisk's incarnation of the Thunderbolts at the time when Mayor Fisk passes a law that forbids superhero activities. He was seen in the woods pursuing Elektra in her Daredevil attire. After evading on of his traps, Elektra is confronted by Kraven who was looking for a challenge in his hunts. Despite giving Elektra a hard time and being assisted by the Thunderbolts agents, Kraven the Hunter was defeated by Elektra.

During the "Beyond" storyline, Kraven the Hunter stalked Ben Reilly's Spider-Man appearance at the time when Ben was working for the Beyond Corporation. After hitting Spider-Man with his special darts to cleanse him for the hunt, Kraven the Hunter triggered an explosion to get away leaving Ben too weak to go after him.

During the "A.X.E.: Judgment Day" storyline, Kraven the Hunter was seen at the North Pole where he hunts a seal. Then he uses its corpse to draw out a polar bear and hunt it. Though Kraven the Hunter did find something on the removed body part of the polar bear. Sometime later, Kraven the Hunter arrived at a Siberian bar wearing the pelt of the dead polar bear and carrying a bag containing a ripped-up Deadpool. A patron speaks in Russian about the mutants becoming apex predators in light of recent events. Kraven the Hunter asks in question "What did you say?" After seeing the Progenitor and showing it an X that he carved into the palm of his left hand, Kraven the Hunter prepared to hunt mutants when Deadpool pulled himself back together. Upon learning that Deadpool was "given the keys" to Krakoa, Kraven the Hunter beheaded him to access a Krakoan gate. Once on Krakoa, he started desecrating the mutant eggs. Then he hunted Maggott, an unidentified blue-skinned mutant, an unidentified mutant with antlers, and a mutant family with tusks. Before slaying Icarus, Kraven the Hunter learned from him that Wolverine was the best among them. This led to Kraven the Hunter abducting Beast and used him to get the knowledge he needed for the Shadow Room which he started to use on Wolverine when he returned. When Wolverine caught up to Kraven the Hunter at the time when the Progenitor's attack on Krakoa caused the Shadow Room to have a structural failure that will cause it collapse, he fought Kraven the Hunter and defeated him as Kraven the Hunter is attacked by a Tyrannosaurus. Sometime after the Progenitor was defeated, an injured Kraven the Hunter finds its remains once again occupied by the Avengers and claims that he will return to Krakoa and butcher the mutants when its end is near and taste the iron in their hearts.

Reception
 In 2020, CBR.com ranked the Kraven the Hunter 10th in their "Marvel: Dark Spider-Man Villains, Ranked From Lamest To Coolest" list.
 In 2022, Screen Rant included Kraven the Hunter in their "15 Most Powerful Black Panther Villains" list.
 In 2022, Screen Rant included Kraven the Hunter in their "10 Spider-Man Villains That Are Smarter Than They Seem" list.
 In 2022, Screen Rant ranked Kraven 1st in their "10 Most Powerful Silk Villains In Marvel Comics" list.
 In 2022, CBR.com ranked Kraven 3rd in their "10 Most Violent Spider-Man Villains" list.

Other versions

2004-05 Marvel Age Spider-Man
In this rendition, Kraven is a hunter from a TV show and claims he will kill Spider-Man when paid by the Chameleon. He defeated Spider-Man once and injured his arm, but Spider-Man barely escapes. When he and the Chameleon fight Spider-Man, he defeats both of them and calls the police.

Amazing Spider-Man: Renew Your Vows
During the "Secret Wars" storyline in the pages of The Amazing Spider-Man: Renew Your Vows, Kraven the Hunter appears as a member of the Regent's Sinister Six, who are tasked to hunt down Spider-Man.

Earth-001
On Earth-001 during the Spider-Verse storyline, Kravinoff (a man that resembles Kraven the Hunter) is a member of the Hounds who are servants of Verna of the Inheritors. He accompanies Verna and the other Hounds when they head to Earth-1610 to hunt Miles Morales. He is killed by the Superior Spider-Man, and his allies Spider-Punk and Assassin Spider-Man.

Earth-31
On Earth-31, set during the End of the Spider-Verse storyline, Sergei Kravinoff found that a giant spider had already killed a lion that he was hunting. As Sergei fought the giant spider, he was bitten by it as Sergei managed to slay the giant spider. The giant spider's bite gave Sergei a spider physiology and the abilities that come with it. Some months later, Sergei took on the name of Hunter Spider where he hunted animal-themed costumed villains upon being contracted by J. Jonah Jameson as he managed to slay Black Cat, Grizzly, Human Fly, Lizard, Puma, Rhino, Stegron, Vulture, and White Rabbit where their remains were made into his hunting trophies. He later joined the Spider-Army during the threat of Shathra.

Earth-803
On Earth-803, set as well during the Spider-Verse storyline, he appears as member of the "Six Men of Sinestry" battling Lady Spider.

Earth-312500
In this alternate reality, Spider-Man kills Kraven and is a fugitive from the law.

Marvel 1602
This dimension's Kraven, known as Karnov, is a member of the Sinister Sextet, the dimension's Sinister Six. In addition to being a hunter, Karnov is also a butcher. The Web Warriors (alternate versions of Spider-Man) visited the 1602 Universe to deal with the Sinister Sextet and apprehended the villains.

Marvel Noir
In Marvel Noir, Kraven is depicted as a former animal trainer in a circus that was taken by Norman Osborn, a mob boss known as "the Goblin", as one of his hitmen and collectors. He was killed when a mass of man-eating spiders covered his body and started eating him during Spider-Man's fight with Osborn. His final act was to kill Osborn when his mangled spider-ridden corpse lands on him, thus spreading the miniature man-eaters.

Marvel Zombies
Kraven is seen on Marvel Zombies: Evil Evolution attacking the Marvel Apes along with other zombies, often hungry for human (or in this case, ape) flesh. He also makes a brief cameo appearance on Marvel Zombies: Dead Days, when the zombie Sinister Six attack Wolverine and Magneto. It is later revealed that he was actually infected by the Earth-Z zombie Sentry, thereby spreading the infection all over the dimension.

Marvel Zombies Return
In the first issue, he is seen with his Sinister Six teammates terrorizing Empire State University after the Kingpin hires them to distract a heist. When a zombified Spider-Man next comes to the dimension, he was zombified by the Zombie Spider-Man after he violently rips out his throat, as Spider-Man's efforts to resist his hunger were overwhelmed by the unique scent of Kraven's various jungle potions. As he next devours Peter's friends alongside the undead Sinister Six, the very-angry Zombie Spider-Man kills him.

Old Man Logan
In the pages of Old Man Logan that took place on Earth-21923, Kraven the Hunter was among the villains that took part in the elimination of the superheroes. During the fight in Manhattan, Kraven the Hunter emerged from the alley after the Punisher killed Electro. He sneaked up on the Punisher and stabbed him in the chest.

In the pages of Old Man Hawkeye, which took place on Earth-807128 before the original "Old Man Logan" arc, there was a hunting group called the Killer Kravinoffs that use the hunting methods of Kraven the Hunter. They consist of Vladlena Kravinoff and her unnamed brothers who seek to live up to the legacy of their grandfather. The Killer Kravinoffs catch up to Marshal Bullseye who trailed Hawkeye to Kree Haven where Abner Jenkins was hiding out in a Doombot factory. They reveal to Bullseye that the President Red Skull has placed a bounty on his head and that they have taken advantage of it due to them being hunters. Bullseye manages to slay the Killer Kravinoffs, though he was too wounded to continue his next attack on Hawkeye.

Secret Warps
In Warp World, where the universe was folded in half during the "Infinity Wars" storyline, Kraven was fused with Bushman. He is a villain of the superhero Aracknight (a fusion between Spider-Man and Moon Knight) and he is seen fighting the Ghost Panther (a fusion between Black Panther and Ghost Rider).

Spider-Gwen
In the Spider-Gwen universe, Kraven the Hunter is a known hunter. To catch Spider-Woman, police captain Frank Castle hired him.

Spider-Man: Life Story
In a continuity where characters naturally aged after Peter Parker became Spider-Man in 1962, an aged Kraven hunts down Spider-Man as he dismisses the events of the Cold War. When Kraven tries burying Peter alive, the Venom symbiote that was bonded to Spider-Man helps him escape the grave and nearly causes him to kill Kraven before Mary Jane helped separate it from him. After that, Kraven feels he had accomplished his goal and gets ready to commit suicide as he's also suffering from cancer. However, the symbiote bonds with Kraven before the hunter commits suicide with his rifle.

In 2019, the Venom-possessed Kraven attacks Peter and Miles Morales in Doctor Doom's space station as the two heroes attempt to shut down Doom's technology across the planet. When he attempts to let the symbiote possess Miles, he discovers that Otto Octavius is possessing Miles's body, allowing Peter the chance to attack him with a sonic blast from his suit. When the symbiote separates from him, he is nothing more than a skeleton.

Ultimate Marvel
In the Ultimate Marvel series, Sergei Kravinoff is a Russian-Australian and the host of his own TV reality show. In the TV show, he hunts down dangerous animals and intends to hunt and kill Spider-Man on live television to boost his ratings (after his first fight with Doctor Octopus attacking Justin Hammer's NY facility). He is arrested after being knocked out with a single punch by the superhero (who was trying to help two people out of an overturned car) and his show is cancelled.

In the Ultimate Six story arc, Kraven the Hunter was interviewed on a talk show where its host questioned him about the "enhancements" he took where he denied any knowledge of it. While exiting the TV studio, Kraven is confronted by the Ultimates for tampering with his genetic structire despite his lawyer's attempt to defuse the situation as Wasp disables the camera that was filming them. He flees before being taken down by Hawkeye. When being taken to his cell by Sharon Carter, Kraven briefly assumed a gruesome animalistic appearance with long messy hair, large hands and feet with claws on them, larger muscles, enlarged red veins, darker skin, fang-like teeth, cat-like eyes, and berserk-like feral behavior before being shocked by the inhibitor collar on him. Kraven eventually escapes from the Triskelion with other Spider-Man villains Green Goblin, Doctor Octopus, Electro, and Sandman. They capture Spider-Man, tie him up, unmask him, humiliate him, and blackmail him into joining their group as its sixth member. On Kraven's part, he blamed Spider-Man for the cancellation of his show, his arrest, his deportation, and his wife leaving him as Norman Osborn keeps Kraven from killing Spider-Man as they need him alive. Kraven in his animalistic form helps with the attack on the White House, though he is electrocuted by a lightning bolt from Thor when he tries to attack Peter in the Oval Office. He is last seen in another S.H.I.E.L.D. containment facility strapped to a bed and surrounded by armed soldiers. Kraven claimed to them that he was under mind control and that he wasn't sure if Green Goblin or Doctor Octopus was responsible.

Kraven the Hunter was among the Triskelion inmates that broke out when Green Goblin broke free from his prison cell.

Alongside the rest of the Ultimate Six, Kraven (who no longer sports his animalistic enhancements) plays a role in "The Death of Spider-Man" storyline. Norman Osborn breaks him and the rest of the Ultimate Six out of the Triskelion and, after their escape, Osborn informs them that God wishes for them to kill Peter Parker as they reform the group, with Vulture as a replacement for Spider-Man. When the Ultimate Six went to Tinkerer for some weapons, Kraven claims a set of blasters and knives while stating to Tinkerer that he is starting a tab. When Electro is shot by Aunt May, an electric surge knocks out Kraven, Sandman, and Vulture.

What The--?!
In What The--?! #3 Kraven appears as a raven called Raven the Hunter.

In other media

Television
 Kraven the Hunter appears in The Marvel Super Heroes "Iron Man" segment episode "Cliffs of Doom", voiced by Chris Wiggins.
 Kraven was intended to appear in Spider-Man (1967), but the producers were unable to use him due to his appearance in due to his appearance in The Marvel Super Heroes. Instead, an Australian hunter named Harley Clivendon (also voiced by Chris Wiggins) appears in his place in the episodes "The One-Eyed Idol" and "Fountain of Terror".
 Kraven the Hunter appears in the Spider-Man (1981) episode "The Hunter and the Hunted", voiced by Jack DeLeon.
 Kraven the Hunter appears in the Spider-Man and His Amazing Friends episode "The Crime of All Centuries", voiced by George DiCenzo.
 Kraven the Hunter appears in Spider-Man: The Animated Series, voiced by Gregg Berger. This version is not portrayed as a villain, only coming into conflict with Spider-Man after the former was driven insane. Additionally, Kraven was originally a big-game hunter who got wounded while saving his fiancé Dr. Mariah Crawford. To save his life, Crawford administered a serum that healed him and strengthened his senses and physical abilities, though it also caused him to become increasingly bestial until Spider-Man assists in curing him. Kraven later returns to help Spider-Man when the latter mutates into a feral Man-Spider. With Crawford and the Punisher's help, Kraven cures Spider-Man of his mutations.   
 A Counter-Earth incarnation of Kraven the Hunter simply called the Hunter appears in the Spider-Man Unlimited episode "Enter the Hunter!", voiced by Paul Dobson. This version is a mercenary working for the High Evolutionary and the rebels opposing him depending on who can pay his fee. Additionally, he is one of a few humans that live in the upper sections of the High Evolutionary's city and utilizes a toxic serum that gives him the traits of certain animals when mixed with their pheromones, but shortens his lifespan.
 Kraven the Hunter appears in Spider-Man: The New Animated Series episode "Mind Games", voiced by Michael Dorn. This version previously fought Spider-Man prior to the series and poisoned the Gaines Twins' parents, which led to the twins acquiring hypnotic powers.
 Kraven the Hunter appears in The Spectacular Spider-Man, voiced by Eric Vesbit. This version was originally a renowned hunter who could take down large animals with only his natural abilities. After being hired to kill Spider-Man and being defeated by him, Kraven enlists Miles Warren to transform him into a humanoid black-maned leonine creature with elements of leopard and cheetah DNA similar to his Ultimate Marvel counterpart. Following a second defeat, Kraven is recruited into the Master Planner's Sinister Six.
 Kraven the Hunter appears in Ultimate Spider-Man, voiced by Diedrich Bader. This version wields high-tech versions of traditional hunting weapons and mystical artifacts he collected from his journeys. Additionally, he killed Hector Ayala / White Tiger and gained an arch-enemy in the latter's daughter Ava Ayala, who took up her father's mantle. Over the course of the series, Kraven goes on to steal the White Tiger amulet, but fail to control its power, join three incarnations of the Sinister Six, briefly bond with the Venom symbiote, and battle Spider-Man and his fellow S.H.I.E.L.D. trainees several times.
 An amalgamated incarnation of Kraven the Hunter appears in Spider-Man (2017), voiced by Troy Baker. Similarly to his Ultimate Marvel counterpart, this version is the host of a TV show called Kraven's Amazing Hunt, though he also possesses Alyosha Kravinoff's long hair and eyepaint as well as scars, a cataract in his right eye, and a cybernetic right arm.
 Kraven the Hunter appears in the Avengers Assemble episode "T'Challa Royale", voiced again by Troy Baker. This version is based on the Spider-Man (2017) incarnation, with the addition of a beard and lack of the cataract eye.

Film

The Amazing Spider-Man series
Marc Webb confirmed that Kraven the Hunter's spear appears in the end credits of the Sony Pictures film The Amazing Spider-Man 2 (2014), with the intent being that Kraven would have appeared in The Sinister Six and in The Amazing Spider-Man 3 before the franchise was cancelled.

Marvel Cinematic Universe
 Director Ryan Coogler revealed that he originally planned to include Kraven in the Marvel Cinematic Universe (MCU) film Black Panther.
 Director Jon Watts stated he was interested in including Kraven in the sequel to the MCU film Spider-Man: Far From Home. The inclusion of Kraven as the main villain in the sequel became a backup plan in case their original intentions for the sequel to include the concept of the multiverse did not pan out. They ultimately did and the film became Spider-Man: No Way Home.

Sony's Spider-Man Universe
In 2018, Sony Pictures announced the development of a Kraven the Hunter film as part of the Sony's Spider-Man Universe with Richard Wenk writing and eyeing Antoine Fuqua to direct. In 2020, the studio hired J. C. Chandor to direct and Art Marcum and Matt Holloway to rewrite the script. In May 2021, it was confirmed that Aaron Taylor-Johnson will portray the character and the film is scheduled to be released on October 6, 2023.

Video games
 Kraven the Hunter appears as a boss in Spider-Man 2: The Sinister Six. This version is a member of the Sinister Six.
 Kraven the Hunter appears as a boss in the Xbox and Game Boy Advance versions of Spider-Man (2002), voiced by Peter Lurie in the Xbox version.
 Kraven appears as a boss in the Spider-Man 3 film tie-in, voiced by Neil Kaplan.
 In the Treyarch version (PS3, Xbox 360, and Microsoft Windows), he is partnered with Calypso, who provides him with various magic spells that give him the powers of a bear, a crow, and a black panther. After Calypso transforms the Lizard into a giant monster, she and Kraven leave Spider-Man to fight the reptile by himself.
 In the Vicarious Visions version (PS2, PSP, and Wii), Kraven leads a group of hunters and only uses one potion that grants him super-speed. He is defeated by Spider-Man shortly before the Lizard mutates himself into a giant monster.
 Kraven the Hunter appears as a boss in the PS2 and PSP versions of Spider-Man: Web of Shadows, voiced by Dwight Schultz.
 Kraven the Hunter appears as a boss in Spider-Man: Shattered Dimensions, voiced by Jim Cummings. Kraven kidnaps Spider-Man and brings him to a jungle temple to hunt him on the former's terms with help from his students. To entice his foe to cooperate, Kraven reveals that he has a piece of the Tablet of Order and Chaos. As Spider-Man hunts Kraven through the jungle, the web-slinger evades his traps and defeats his hunters before fighting him in a cage match, resulting in Kraven's defeat. Humiliated in front of his students, Kraven uses the tablet piece to enhance himself, gaining superhuman speed and strength. However, he is defeated by Spider-Man, who claims his tablet fragment.
 In the Nintendo DS version, the Marvel Noir version of Calypso planned to use her tablet fragment to raise an army of zombies and resurrect her version of Kraven, though she is unsuccessful.
 Kraven the Hunter serves as inspiration for one of Mike Haggar's costumes in Ultimate Marvel vs. Capcom 3.
 Kraven the Hunter appears in Marvel: Avengers Alliance as a member of the Sinister Six.
 Kraven the Hunter appears as a playable character in Lego Marvel Super Heroes, voiced by JB Blanc.
 Kraven the Hunter appears as a boss in The Amazing Spider-Man 2 film tie-in game, voiced by Steve Blum in the console version and Nolan North in the mobile version. This version is a renowned hunter who is hired by Wilson Fisk to eliminate the latter's rivals and hunt down Oscorp's failed cross-species experiments. Along the way, he manipulates Spider-Man into helping him by engaging in vigilantism and serving as a mentor to him until the web-slinger eventually discovers the truth and defeats him.
 In the mobile version, Kraven is depicted as the leader of the Russian Mob and in the middle of a gang war with Hammerhead, clashing with Spider-Man on several different occasions.
 Kraven the Hunter appears in Marvel Heroes.
 Kraven the Hunter appears as a playable character in Marvel: Future Fight as a member of the Sinister Six.
 Kraven the Hunter appears as a playable character in Marvel Puzzle Quest.
 Kraven the Hunter appears as a playable character and boss in Lego Marvel Super Heroes 2, voiced by Ronan Summers.
 Kraven the Hunter will appear in Spider-Man 2.

Miscellaneous
 Kraven the Hunter appears in The Amazing Spider-Man newspaper strip.
 Kraven the Hunter appears in Spider-Man: Turn Off the Dark, portrayed by Christopher Tierney. In some productions, this version was a scientist who was experimented on by the Green Goblin while in others, he was the comics' portrayal of Kraven. In all productions, he becomes a member of the Sinister Six.
 A future incarnation of Kraven from a variation of Old Man Logan's timeline appears in Marvel's Wastelanders: Old Man Star-Lord, voiced by Patrick Page.
 Kraven the Hunter appears in the 1966 Aurora plastic model kit.

See also
 "The Gauntlet and Grim Hunt"
The Most Dangerous Game

References

External links
 Kraven the Hunter at Marvel.com
 Ultimate Kraven the Hunter at Marvel.com
 Ultimate Spiderman Kraven the hunter
 

Characters created by Stan Lee
Characters created by Steve Ditko
Comics characters introduced in 1964
Fictional assassins in comics
Fictional characters from New York City
Fictional characters with slowed ageing
Fictional characters with superhuman durability or invulnerability
Fictional professional hunters
Fictional murderers
Fictional suicides
Fictional Russian people
Fictional Soviet people
Fictional immigrants to the United States
Villains in animated television series
Marvel Comics undead characters
Marvel Comics characters who can move at superhuman speeds
Marvel Comics characters with superhuman senses
Marvel Comics characters with superhuman strength
Marvel Comics mutates
Marvel Comics supervillains
Marvel Comics male supervillains
Spider-Man characters